Estadio Vicente Carreño Alonso is a municipal stadium in Corralejo. It is home to the football club CD Corralejo.

Gallery

Sports venues in the Canary Islands
Fuerteventura